Rugby sevens at the 2003 Pacific Games was played as a tournament for 11 men's teams from 3–5 July 2003 at Suva in Fiji. The Fijian team won the final, defeating Cook Islands by 43–10 to claim the gold medal.

Medal summary

Participants
There were 11 teams for the 2003 tournament:

Format
The eleven teams were drawn into three pools and the first stage was played as a round robin within each group. The top two teams from the each pool and the best two third-placed teams advanced to the knockout stage.

Quarterfinals and semifinals in the knockout stage were followed by the third place play-off for the Bronze Medal, and the final for the Gold Medal.

Preliminary round

Group A

Group A matches:

Group B

Group B matches:

Group C

Group C matches:

Knockout stage

Championship bracket

Play-offs for 5th to 8th

Play-offs for 9th to 13th

See also
Rugby sevens at the Pacific Games
Pacific Games

References

rugby union
2003
2003 in Oceanian rugby union
2003 in Fijian rugby union
2003 rugby sevens competitions
International rugby union competitions hosted by Fiji